Juan Mónaco was the defending champion, but chose not to participate that year.

Juan Martín del Potro won in the final 6–2, 6–1, against Jürgen Melzer.

Seeds

Draw

Finals

Top half

Bottom half

External links
Draw
Qualifying draw

Singles